KIXZ (940 AM) is a radio station broadcasting a News Talk Information format. Licensed to Amarillo, Texas, United States, the station serves the Amarillo area. The station is currently owned by Townsquare Media and is licensed to Gap Broadcasting Amarillo License, LLC. The station features programming from Fox News Radio, Compass Media Networks, Premiere Networks, Radio America, Texas State Network, and Westwood One. Its studios are located on Southwest 34th Avenue in Southwest Amarillo, and its transmitter tower is based southeast of the city in unincorporated Randall County.

KIXZ's format was flipped from Nostalgia/Big Band to News/Talk, as "News/Talk 940" in late March 2003 during the beginning of the Iraq War. The initial lineup included Glenn Beck 8a-11a, Dr. Laura (tape delay from previous weekday) 11a-2p, Sean Hannity 2p-5p and Michael Savage 5p-8p. KIXZ ran a top 40 format in the 1960s, going up against KPUR.

Wink Martindale was a prominent DJ on the Jones Radio Network, Nostalgia/Big Band format, featured in the late 1990s and early 2000s on KIXZ.

References

External links

IXZ
News and talk radio stations in the United States
Radio stations established in 1988
Townsquare Media radio stations